Chaka Demus & Pliers are a Jamaican reggae duo made up of deejay Chaka Demus (born John Taylor) and singer Pliers (born Everton Bonner), known for their hits "Tease Me" and "Murder She Wrote". As a duo, they enjoyed more commercial success with mainstream pop fans after their collaboration began in the early 1990s than either had in their previous solo careers.

Career
Both artists were established musicians when they teamed up in 1991 after performing together in Miami, both having worked as solo artists, and Pliers as a duo with Pinchers. Their early hits together included "Gal Wine", recorded for producer Ossie Hibbert. They went on to work with a string of producers, including Ranking Joe, Jah Screw, Prince Jammy, and Mafia & Fluxy, with several of their most successful single tracks included on their debut album Gal Wine (1992).

They appeared at Reggae Sunsplash in 1992, and the following year broke through to international success with "Tease Me", which was in the UK Singles Chart for three months in 1993, peaking at No. 3 in July. They followed this with a cover of Curtis Mayfield's "She Don't Let Nobody" and a cover (with collaboration of Jack Radics) of the Top Notes' "Twist and Shout", which topped the UK Singles Chart in early 1994, the duo becoming the first Jamaican act to top the chart in 8 years, and the first to have three consecutive top five hits on the chart. They had further UK hits with "I Wanna Be Your Man" (No. 19) and "Gal Wine" (No. 20), with six hit singles in all taken from their album, Tease Me. The re-release of Tease Me also charted at number one on the UK Albums Chart in 1994, going on to receive gold certification, selling more than 500,000 copies.

In 1996, they signed to Island Records and released the album For Every Kinda People.

They performed at Sunsplash again in 2004 and 2008, and released the album Help Them Lord in 2001.

In 2007, Chaka Demus & Pliers recorded "Need Your Lovin", which was released on vinyl on Explorer Records. This song was a hit on the Jamaican chart.

On 18 November 2007, Chaka Demus & Pliers performed "Murder She Wrote" alongside Alicia Keys at the 2007 American Music Awards. In the summer of 2008, they performed at the annual Detroit Caribbean Festival. Their latest album So Proud was released on 6 October 2008.

In July 2013, Chaka Demus & Pliers performed at the BET Awards show in the reggae segment alongside Dawn Penn, Beenie Man and Elephant Man.

Discography

Albums
Gal Wine Wine Wine (1992), Greensleeves
Bad Mind (1992), Pow Wow
Ruff This Year (1992), RAS
Tease Me (1993), Mango (also released as All She Wrote) – UK #1 (BPI: Platinum), NZ #6, AUS #45, US Reggae Albums #7
For Every Kinda People (1996), Island – US Reggae Albums #14
Consciousness A Lick (1995), Melodie
Dangerous (2000), Fuel 2000
Help Them Lord (2001), RAS
Trouble and War (2003), Prestige
Back Against the Wall (2005), Explorer
Back Off the Wall, Nocturne
So Proud (2008), AGR/Universal

Compilations
Gold (1992), Charm
Chaka Demus & Pliers (1992), Charm
Unstoppable 1986-1992 (1996), Emporio
Murder She Wrote (2000), Spectrum
Dancehall Dons (2001), Recall
Ultimate Collection (2002), Hip O
Dancehall Classics (2004), Rhythm Club
Run the City (2006), Dynamic
On Top of the World (2008), Dynamic

Singles

References

Jamaican reggae musical groups
Jamaican musical duos
Reggae duos
Island Records artists
Trojan Records artists